York Cemetery is a cemetery located in the North York area of Toronto, Ontario, Canada.

History
The site of York Cemetery was originally a property farmed by Joseph Shepard, who bought the land in 1805. The brick farm house on the property was constructed in 1837 by Joseph's son, Michael. Prior to the 1940s, the land was also used as the short-lived Willowdale Airfield.

In 1916, the Toronto General Burying Grounds (now the Mount Pleasant Group of Cemeteries) bought the property but didn't start to convert the 172 acres (70 ha) for cemetery use until 1946, two years before the cemetery officially opened in 1948. The cemetery once fronted on Yonge Street, but in 1966, eighteen and a half acres were sold to the city of North York (now part of Toronto). The cemetery has continued to develop, with the addition of a chapel and reception centre, and also the newly built "garden of remembrance".

It is unknown to the public if the cemetery will develop the land it controls at the bottom of the ravine and neighbouring Burnett Avenue Park.  Cemetery officials have previously indicated an intention to develop these lands at community meetings.

Notable interments 

 Blagoje Bratić (1946–2008), member of the Yugoslav national soccer team; later as Canadian sports director and coach
 Arnold Chan (1967–2017), Member of Parliament for Scarborough-Agincourt 2014–2017 and Deputy Government House Leader
 Barbara Frum (1937–1992), Canadian television news anchor and journalist (CBC)
 Nick Harbaruk (1943–2011), Polish-born Canadian WHA and NHL hockey player
 Murray Henderson (1921–2013), hockey player
 Tim Horton (1930–1974), former Toronto Maple Leafs player and co-founder of Tim Hortons
 Bob Jarvis (1935–2017), Canadian lawyer and politician
 Zoran Kosanović (1956–1998), Serbian-Canadian table tennis player
 Cynthia Lai (1954-2022), Politician, represented Ward 23 Scarborough North on the Toronto City Council
 Her Imperial Highness Grand Duchess Olga Alexandrovna of Russia (1882–1960), along with her husband Captain Nikolai Kulikovsky (1881–1958)
 Jesse Nilsson (1977–2003), Canadian television actor
 Henry Howey Robson (1897–1964), British-born recipient of the Victoria Cross
 Percy Saltzman (1915–2007), Canadian meteorologist, first weatherman on Canadian television
 Bruce Smith (1949–2013), professional football player

See also
 List of cemeteries in York Region

References

External links 

 York Cemetery
 Friends of York Cemetery and Burnett Park

Cemeteries in Toronto
North York
1948 establishments in Ontario